"Mourning" is a song written and recorded by the American rock band Tantric. It was released as the third single from the band's platinum selling first album titled Tantric in 2001. It is the band's second highest charting single to date behind "Breakdown".

Charts

Appearances 
"Mourning" was used on the soundtrack of the 2002 movie The Salton Sea.

Tantric (band) songs
2001 singles
2001 songs
Maverick Records singles
Songs written by Hugo Ferreira
Songs written by Jesse Vest
Songs written by Todd Whitener
Songs written by Matt Taul